Kengyilia is a genus of Asian plants in the grass family. The genus is named in honor of Yi Li Keng.

 Species
 Kengyilia alatavica (Drobow) J.L.Yang, C.Yen & B.R.Baum - Gansu, Xinjiang, Tibet, Mongolia, Kazakhstan, Kyrgyzstan
 Kengyilia batalinii (Krasn.) J.L.Yang, C.Yen & B.R.Baum - Xinjiang, Tibet, Mongolia, Kazakhstan, Uzbekistan, Tajikistan, Kyrgyzstan, Afghanistan
 Kengyilia eremopyroides Nevski ex C.Yen, J.L.Yang & B.R.Baum - Qinghai 
 Kengyilia geminata (Keng & S.L.Chen) S.L.Chen - Qinghai
 Kengyilia gobicola C.Yen & J.L.Yang - Xinjiang
 Kengyilia grandiglumis (Keng & S.L.Chen) J.L.Yang, C.Yen & B.R.Baum - Qinghai
 Kengyilia guidenensis C.Yen, J.L.Yang & B.R.Baum - Qinghai
 Kengyilia habahenensis B.R.Baum, C.Yen & J.L.Yang - Xinjiang
 Kengyilia hejingensis L.B.Cai & D.F.Cui - Xinjiang
 Kengyilia hirsuta (Keng) J.L.Yang, C.Yen & B.R.Baum - Gansu, Qinghai, Xinjiang
 Kengyilia kaschgarica (D.F.Cui) L.B.Cai - Xinjiang
 Kengyilia kokonorica (Keng) J.L.Yang, C.Yen & B.R.Baum - Gansu, Ningxia, Qinghai, Xinjiang, Tibet
 Kengyilia kryloviana (Schischk.) C.Yen, J.L.Yang & B.R.Baum - Kazakhstan, Altai Krai
 Kengyilia laxiflora (Keng) S.L.Chen - Gansu, Qinghai, Sichuan
 Kengyilia laxistachya L.B.Cai, D.F.Cui - Xinjiang
 Kengyilia melanthera (Keng & S.L.Chen) J.L.Yang, C.Yen & B.R.Baum - Qinghai
 Kengyilia mutica (Keng & S.L.Chen) J.L.Yang, C.Yen & B.R.Baum - Qinghai
 Kengyilia pamirica J.L.Yang & C.Yen - Xinjiang
 Kengyilia pendula L.B.Cai - Qinghai
 Kengyilia pulcherrima (Grossh.) C.Yen, J.L.Yang & B.R.Baum - Kazakhstan, Uzbekistan, Turkmenistan, Iran, Turkey, Caucasus
 Kengyilia rigidula (Keng) S.L.Chen - Gansu, Qinghai, Tibet
 Kengyilia shawanensis L.B.Cai - Xinjiang
 Kengyilia stenachyra (Keng) S.L.Chen - Gansu, Qinghai
 Kengyilia tahelacana J.L.Yang, C.Yen & B.R.Baum - Xinjiang
 Kengyilia thoroldiana (Oliv.) J.L.Yang, C.Yen & B.R.Baum - Gansu, Qinghai, Xinjiang, Tibet, Sikkim
 Kengyilia zadoiensis S.L.Lu & Y.H.Wu - Qinghai
 Kengyilia zhaosuensis J.L.Yang, C.Yen & B.R.Baum - Xinjiang

 formerly included
 Kengyilia leiantha - Elymus macrourus

References

External links
 Grassbase - The World Online Grass Flora

Pooideae
Poaceae genera